Jamestown is an unincorporated community located along Interstate 40 in McKinley County, New Mexico, United States. El Paso Natural Gas Company built a refinery at the Continental Divide in New Mexico around the area of 35.48698357712149, -108.4264608980443. The refinery was known locally as the Gallup Refinery or the Ciniza Refinery. By 1964, El Paso Gas sold the refinery to the Shell Oil Company. Then in 1982, Giant Oil Refining purchased the refinery from Shell.  In 1987. Giant built the largest truck stop and retail facility in their chain one mile south from the refinery.  On June 7, 2003, Giant sold its travel center in Jamestown to Pilot Travel Centers.  Pilot Travel Center #305 houses Jamestown's post office; the post office has ZIP code 87347. Also inside the travel center's mall are a Subway and a Denny's as well as a thirty-seat theater. Near the mall, and still part of the Pilot Travel Center, is a Bosselman Boss Shop available for full service truck servicing and repair.

According to USA Today, in 1993 the truck stop and refinery were the only two establishments in the community. By 2020, there were also a Fire Department and a Gun Supply store   The oil refinery changed ownership several times and was slated to close by October of 2020, as per its last owner, Marathon Petrolueum.

Demographics

Education
It is in Gallup-McKinley County Public Schools. Its zoned schools are Del Norte Elementary School, Kennedy Middle School, and Hiroshi Miyamura High School.

References

Unincorporated communities in McKinley County, New Mexico
Unincorporated communities in New Mexico